The 2016 season was the 111th season of competitive football in Norway.

The season began in March, and ended in December with the 2016 Norwegian Football Cup Final.

Men's football

Promotion and relegation
Teams promoted to Tippeligaen
 Sogndal
 Brann

Teams relegated from Tippeligaen
 Mjøndalen
 Sandefjord

League season

Eliteserien

1. divisjon

2. divisjon

Group 1

Group 2

Group 3

Group 4

3. divisjon

Norwegian Cup

Final

Women's football

Promotion and relegation
Teams promoted to Toppserien
 Urædd

Teams relegated from Toppserien
 Amazon Grimstad

League season

Toppserien

1. divisjon

Norwegian Women's Cup

Final
LSK Kvinner 2–0 Røa

National teams

Norway men's national football team

Norway women's national football team

References

 
Seasons in Norwegian football